Fortran 5 was an electronic music band active during the 1990s.

Background
The band were made up of members David Baker and Simon Leonard, who had previously worked together on the music project known as I Start Counting. Around 1990, they had begun recording new material, and realised that the new music had a different sound compared to their previous electropop style. They decided to rename their project Fortran 5 in order to give their new dance/techno style a fresh start. The new project also involved the duo collaborating and working with a number of other artists. These included Kris Weston of The Orb, and Rod Slater from Bonzo Dog Doo-Dah Band.
The band's final album was titled Avocado Suite and was their most experimental work; this was far removed from their early electropop sound.
Fortran 5 also remixed songs from artists such as Inspiral Carpets, Erasure and Laibach.

Simon Leonard also wrote a novella called Fortran 5, which was published by Malice Aforethought Press.

Discography

Albums
 1991 - Blues (Mute Records)
 1993 - Bad Head Park (Mute Records)
 1995 - Avocado Suite (Mute Records)

References

English electronic music duos
Mute Records artists